Mastorochoria is a former municipality in the Ioannina regional unit, Epirus, Greece. Since the 2011 local government reform it is part of the municipality Konitsa, of which it is a municipal unit. The municipal unit has an area of 271.160 km2. Population 930 (2011). The seat of the municipality was in Pyrsogianni.

Subdivisions
The municipal unit Mastorochoria is subdivided into the following communities (constituent villages in brackets):
Pyrsogianni
 Asimochori https://goo.gl/maps/SrrbThcxPmCBXVQw7
 Vourmpiani
 Gorgopotamos
 Drosopigi
 Kastaniani
 Kefalochori
 Lagkada
 Oxya (Oxya, Theotokos)
 Plagia
 Plikati
 Chionades

External links
Περισσότερα για την περιοχή (in Greek)
Official municipality website

References

Populated places in Ioannina (regional unit)
Pindus